The Uria (in its upper course also: Lupul) is a right tributary of the river Olt in Romania. It flows into the Olt in Câinenii Mari.

References

Rivers of Romania
Rivers of Vâlcea County